Vyborg Library is a library in Vyborg, Russia, built during the time of Finnish sovereignty (1918 to 1940-44), before the Finnish city of Viipuri was annexed by the former USSR and its Finnish name was changed to Vyborg by the Soviet authorities.

The building, built from 1927 to 1935, is an internationally acclaimed design by the Finnish architect Alvar Aalto and one of the major examples of 1920s functionalist architectural design. The library is considered one of the first manifestations of "regional modernism". It is particularly famous for its wave-shaped ceiling in the auditorium, the shape of which, Aalto argued, was based on acoustic studies. On completion the library was known as Viipuri Library, but after the Second World War and Soviet annexation, the library was renamed the Nadezhda Krupskaya Municipal Library. Nowadays, integrated in the Russian Federation city of Vyborg, the library is officially known as the Central City Alvar Aalto Library.

The library restoration project lasted almost two decades from 1994 until late 2013. The restoration work was awarded with the World Monuments Fund / Knoll Modernism Prize in 2014 and the Europa Nostra Award in 2015.

History 

Aalto received the commission to design the library after winning first prize (with his proposal titled 'WWW') in an architectural competition for the building held in 1927. Aalto's design went through a profound transformation from the original architectural competition proposal designed in the Nordic Classicism style (owing much to Swedish architect Gunnar Asplund, especially his Stockholm City Library) to the severely functionalist building, completed eight years later in a purist modernist style. Such architectural solutions as a sunken reading-well, free-flowing ceilings and cylindrical skylights, first tested in Viipuri, would regularly appear in Aalto's works. Aalto differed from the first generation of modernist architects (such as Walter Gropius and Le Corbusier) in his predilection for natural materials: in this design, "wood was first introduced into an otherwise modernist setting of concrete, white stucco, glass, and steel".

World War II marked a turning point in the history not only of the library but the city of Vyborg itself, as it was ceded to the Soviet Union. The building had been damaged during World War II, and plans by the new Soviet authorities to repair it were proposed but never carried out. The building then remained empty for a decade, causing even more damage, including the destruction of the wave-shaped auditorium ceiling.  During the 1950s schemes were drawn up for its restoration — including a version in the Stalinist classical style typical of the time — by architect Aleksandr Shver.
Until the coming to power of Mikhail Gorbachev, few people from Finland, let alone other Western countries, visited Vyborg, and there were many different accounts in Western architectural texts about the condition of the library, including erroneous reports of its complete destruction. The building is now included in the Russian Federation's list of objects of historical and cultural heritage.

Restoration
Russian and Finnish committees have been founded to promote the restoration of the building, which has been progressing piecemeal, while the building remains in public use. The restoration is being directed by the Alvar Aalto Academy, under the direction of architect Tapani Mustonen, together with input from architect Maija Kairamo (formerly of the Finnish National Board of Antiquities) and ex-Aalto employees, architects Eric Adlercreutz, Vazio Nava and Leif Englund. In 1998, to mark the 100th anniversary of Aalto's birth, a 2×10-metre section of the auditorium ceiling was reconstructed,  but it was taken down in 2008 to enable the reconstruction of the ceiling proper.

In September 2003 an international seminar and workshop was held at the library, under the auspicies of DOCOMOMO, to discuss the restoration of the library, as well as its role within the local community. Experts in restoration from around the world attended.

In the first phase (until 2009), the following parts of the building have been restored: the large glass wall in front of the main stairs; the roofs (including the cylindrical roof-lights); the steel windows and external doors; entrance to the children's library; the former janitor's flat; the periodicals reading room; the auditorium, including reconstruction of the undulating suspended ceiling. Due to piecemeal funding, the restoration has progressed slowly. The restorers have emphasised that the work has progressed in terms of greatest urgency; thus, to the casual observer, the interior walls still have flaking paint, giving an impression of lack of maintenance; but the restorers argue that this is the least important aspect of the work, compared to significant structural repairs. To mark the progress of the restoration, a book outlining both the history of the building and the restoration work was published in 2009, "Alvar Aalto Library in Vyborg: Saving a Modern Masterpiece", edited by Kairamo, Mustonen and Nava.

The restoration project gained speed in 2010 when Finnish president Tarja Halonen met with then-Russian prime minister Vladimir Putin and asked about the library. Shortly after this the project received 6,5 million euros funding from Moscow. In late 2013 the restoration was finally finished, having cost nearly 9 million euros altogether. Architect Maija Kairamo praised the end result and said she wasn't sure whether the building was in as fine a condition even when it was originally opened.

In 2014, the restoration committee and the library received the World Monuments Fund / Knoll Modernism Prize for the restoration work. In 2015 it also received the Europa Nostra Award, the jury calling the restoration "exceptionally well-researched and highly sensitive" and commending the project's transnational collaboration.

In art
The Vyborg Library has also been the starting point for a very different kind of art project, a film titled What's the time in Vyborg? (2002) by Finnish-American artist Liisa Roberts. Roberts was challenging the introspective view Finns have of their former city, by organising and filming writing workshops arranged for local Vyborg youths.

Quotes 
When I designed the Viipuri City Library (and I had plenty of time, a whole five years), I spent long periods getting my range, as it were, with naive drawings. I drew all kinds of fantastic mountain landscapes, with slopes lit by many suns in different positions, which gradually gave rise to the main idea of the building. The architectural framework of the library comprises several reading and lending areas stepped at different levels, with the administrative and supervisory centre at the peak. My childlike drawings were only indirectly linked with architectural thinking, but they eventually led to an interweaving of the section and ground plan, and to a kind of unity of horizontal and vertical construction. (Alvar Aalto, "The Trout and the Stream", 1947)

References

External links 
  
 Alvar Aalto Foundation website
 

 Vyborg Library on Architectuul
The restoration of Alvar Aalto Library in Vyborg at Google Arts and Culture

Alvar Aalto buildings
Buildings and structures completed in 1935
Buildings and structures in Vyborg
Restored and conserved buildings
Libraries in Russia
Modernist architecture in Finland
Modernist architecture in Russia
Organizations based in Vyborg
Cultural heritage monuments of federal significance in Leningrad Oblast